Rhagastis acuta is a moth of the  family Sphingidae. It is known from south-east Asia, including India, Thailand and Indonesia.

It is similar to Rhagastis velata and Rhagastis hayesi. The upperside of the abdomen has a pair of vestigial or well-developed lateral golden stripes. The forewing upperside is similar to Rhagastis castor aurifera. It has an olive-green tone. The forewing underside has postmedian dots and a submarginal band which is not joined to the basal area. The hindwing underside is without a small black discal spot.

References

Rhagastis
Moths described in 1856